Protolophus niger is a species of harvestman in the family Protolophidae. It is found in the western US.

References

Harvestmen
Articles created by Qbugbot
Animals described in 1942